Ukraine has diverse geographic features, including several waterfalls. A vast number of rivers run through the mountain ranges. The snow melt from the mountains feeding the rivers and sudden drops in elevation create many opportunities for waterfalls to form.

Carpathian waterfalls

Most of the waterfalls in the Carpathian Mountains are short and cascade waterfalls.
Shypit – a famous waterfall where an annual festival has been held since 1993, attracts thousands of tourists. The waterfall is created by the Pylypets River, a tributary of Repynka River.
 Kamianka waterfall  It is located by the village of Dubyna, Skole district, L'vivs'ka oblast. The waterfall is a part of the Skole Beskydy National Recreation Reserve of Ukraine.
 Sukil waterfalls
 Bukovina waterfalls (also known as Smuharski waterfalls) – a landscape hydrological preserve in Vyzhnytsia Raion. The waterfall is created by Smuhariv Brook, a right tributary of the Cheremosh River.
 Bukhtivets waterfall – part of Bukhtivets Brook (a left tributary of Bystrytsia of Nadvirna), located in the Gorgany mountain range.
 Silver waterfalls or Sheshory waterfalls – created by Pistynka River in Kosiv Raion.
 Vyshovatyi village waterfall – appears after rain showers near one of Tiachiv Raion villages.
 Voyevodyn waterfall – created by the Voyevodyn River within the State ornithological reserve "Falcons Rocks".
 Horodyliv waterfall – a cascade of waterfalls created by Horodyliv Brook, a right tributary of the Rika River.
 Hurkalo
 Dzembroni waterfalls – created by Munchel Brook, a tributary of the Dzembronia River.
 Drahobrat waterfall – created by Kysva Brook, a tributary of the Chorna Tisa River.
 Zhenetskyi Huk

Crimean waterfalls

 Uchan-su waterfall – the highest Ukrainian waterfall (98 metres) is located on the southern slopes of the Crimean Mountains close to the city of Yalta. The Uchan-su River begins at the foot of Ai-Petri Mountain and flows down the gorge. The waterfall is formed  from the source.
 Curcur waterfall (Jurjur waterfall) – created by Eastern Ulu Ozen (Megapotamo) near Alushta.
 Jurla waterfall – created by Jurla River.
 Geyser waterfall – created by Jurla River.
 Suv Ucqan waterfall – created by Qızıl Qoba River, a tributary of the Salhir River.
 Golovkinsky waterfall – created by Ozen Bas, a tributary of Ulu Ozen.
 Holovkinskoho waterfall – created by the Uzen'-Bash River.

Non-mountainous waterfalls
 Dzhurynskyi Fall is located on the Dzhuryn river in Nyrkiv village,  Zalishchyky Raion,  Ternopil Oblast of western Ukraine
 Vyr – created by Hirsky Tikych River, a tributary of Tikych River.
 Vchelka waterfall – created by Hnylopiat River, a right tributary of Teteriv River.

Gallery

See also

 List of rivers of Ukraine

References

Lists of tourist attractions in Ukraine
Lists of landforms of Ukraine
Ukraine